The Boesio is a river (intermittent stream) in Valcuvia, a valley in the north of   the province of Varese, Lombardy, Italy. 
It rises near Cuveglio and flowing in an east–west direction before entering Lake Maggiore at Laveno-Mombello.

The river's course takes it through the communes of Cuveglio, Cuvio, Casalzuigno, Azzio, Brenta, Gemonio, Cittiglio and Laveno-Mombello. The state road SS 394 follows in part the course of the river.

Fish found in the river include Salmonidae and Cyprinidae, in particular brown trout and  vairone (Leuciscus souffia). The waters of the river are polluted.

Notes

Rivers of the Province of Varese
Rivers of Italy